Nosrat-ollah Jahanshahlou (1913–2012) was a leftist Iranian politician. He was among The Fifty-Three group who were arrested because of their political activities in November 1938 in Iran. After World War II he joined to the separatist movement of Azerbaijan People's Government in Tabriz. During this time he served as the first chancellor of University of Tabriz. After collapse of the Azerbaijani government by the Imperial Iranian Army, he fled to the USSR with couple of other members of Azerbaijani Democratic Party. After 26 years of residing in Soviet Azerbaijan he immigrated to East Germany, then to Switzerland.

Personal life
He born in Tehran to Zanjani father in May 1913. He graduated from University of Tehran with Doctor of Medicine degree. He died in Berlin, Germany at the age of 99.

References

1913 births
German people of Azerbaijani descent
Azerbaijani Democratic Party politicians
2012 deaths
People from Tehran
Iranian emigrants to the Soviet Union
German emigrants to Switzerland
Tudeh Party of Iran politicians
Academic staff of the University of Tabriz
Presidents of the University of Tabriz
Soviet emigrants to Germany
People granted political asylum in the Soviet Union